

Finance

 Leonard L. Abess (born 1948), owner and CEO of City National Bank of Florida
 Bill Ackman (born 1966), hedge fund manager and investor, founder of Pershing Square Capital Management and co-founder of investment firm Gotham Partners
 Les Alexander (born 1944), investor, founder of the Alexander Group, former owner of NBA's Houston Rockets
 Sergey Aleynikov (born 1969/1970), Russian-American founder of financial consulting firm Omnibius
 Bill (born 1949), Peter (1952–2017), Susan (born 1946) and Ted Alfond (born 1945), investors; members of the Alfond family
 James Altucher (born 1968), hedge fund manager and tech investor, founder of StockPickr
 Shari Arison (born 1957), American-Israeli investor, owner of Bank Hapoalim; member of the Arison family
 Jeff Aronson (born 1958), co-founder of Centerbridge Partners, former partner at Angelo Gordon
 Cliff Asness (born 1966), hedge fund manager, co-founder of AQR Capital
 Jules Bache (1861–1944), founder of J. S. Bache & Co.
 Ronald S. Baron (born 1943), investor, founder of Baron Capital Management
 Joseph Ainslie Bear (1878–1955), co-founder of investment bank Bear Stearns
 Jordan Belfort (born 1962), former stock broker, founder of Stratton Oakmont
 Rebecka Belldegrun (born 1950), Finnish-born investor, CEO of BellCo Capital; wife of Arie Belldegrun
 Bob Benmosche (1944–2015), investment banker, former president and CEO of the American International Group (AIG)
 Roger Berlind (1930–2020), co-founder of Carter, Berlind, Potoma & Weill 
 David Bergstein (born 1962), founder of private equity firm Cyrano Group
 Bruce R. Berkowitz (born 1957/1958), founder of Fairholme Capital Management
 Paul P. (born 1934) and Zalman Bernstein (1926–1999), co-founders of investment-management firm Sanford C. Bernstein & Company (now AllianceBernstein)
 Leon Black (born 1951), co-founder of Apollo Global Management
 Lloyd C. Blankfein (born 1954), former CEO of Goldman Sachs
 Leonard Blavatnik (born 1957), Ukraine-born British-American investor, founder of Access Industries (owns Warner Music Group, Deezer, DAZN)
 Michael Bloomberg (born 1942), co-founder of global financial services, software and mass media company Bloomberg
 Alfred S. Bloomingdale (1916–1982), co-founder of Diners Club International
 Richard C. Blum (born 1935), founder of Blum Capital
 Ivan Boesky (born 1937), former financier and insider trader, founder of Ivan F. Boesky & Company
 David Bonderman (born 1942), co-founder of TPG Capital
 Bill Browder (born 1964), American-British financier, co-founder of Hermitage Capital Management
 B. Gerald Cantor (1916–1996), founder of Cantor Fitzgerald
 Arthur L. Carter (born 1931), investment banker, co-founder of Carter, Berlind, & Weill
 Stanley Chais (1926–2010), former investment advisor and money manager
 Marshall Cogan (born 1937), former partner at Cogan, Berlind, Weill & Levitt and founder of the United Automotive Group
 Abby Joseph Cohen (born 1953), advisory director at Goldman Sachs
 Peter A. Cohen (born 1946/1947), chairman and CEO of Cowen Group
 Steven A. Cohen (born 1956), hedge fund manager, founder of Point72 Asset Management and SAC Capital Advisors
 Gary Cohn (born 1960), former COO of Goldman Sachs; Chief Economic Advisor to President Trump (until March 2018)
 Leon Cooperman (born 1943), investor and hedge fund manager, chairman of Omega Advisors
 Mark Cuban (born 1958), start-up investor, owner of NBA's Dallas Mavericks, co-founder of 2929 Entertainment
 Jon P. Diamond (born 1957), co-founder of the Safe Auto Insurance Company
 Glenn Dubin (born 1957), hedge fund manager, co-founder of Highbridge Capital Management, co-owner of global merchant firm CCI
 Asher Edelman (born 1939), Corporate raider
 Joseph Edelman (born 1955), founder of hedge fund Perceptive Advisors
 David Einhorn (born 1968), investor, hedge fund manager, founder of Greenlight Capital
 Lewis Eisenberg (born 1942), co-founder of private equity firm Granite Capital International Group
 Thomas George Stemberg (1949–2015), He was a pioneer of the office supplies superstore industry
 Michael R. Eisenson, co-founder of Charlesbank Capital Partners
 Steve Eisman (born 1962), investor, co-founder of Emrys Partners, managing director at Neuberger Berman
 Israel "Izzy" Englander (born 1948), investor, founder of Millennium Management
 Boris Epshteyn (born 1982), Russian-born investment banker
 Jeffrey Epstein (1953–2019), financier, founder of Intercontinental Assets Group and J. Epstein Co.
 Andrew Fastow (born 1961), former CFO of Enron
 Irwin Federman (born 1936), General Partner of U.S. Venture Partners (USVP) 
 Steve Feinberg (born 1960), co-founder of Cerberus Capital Management
 Karen Finerman (born 1965), co-founder of hedge fund Metropolitan Capital Advisors
 Laurence D. Fink (born 1952), financial executive, co-founder of BlackRock, the world's largest asset manager.
 William S. Fisher (born 1958), investor, hedge fund manager, founder of Manzanita Capital; Gap heir
 Lee Fixel (born 1980), investor, partner at Tiger Management
 John Frankel (born 1961), British-American founder of ff Venture Capital
 Martin Frankel (born 1954), investor, founder of Winthrop Capital; known for using astrology to make financial trading decisions
 Jacob A. Frenkel (born 1943), Israeli-American chairman of JPMorgan Chase International
 Tully Friedman (born 1942), co-founder of Hellman & Friedman (H&F), Friedman Fleischer & Lowe (FFL)
 Jeremy Frommer, hedge fund manager, former co-CEO of RBC Capital Markets
 Richard S. Fuld Jr. (born 1946), former (and last) CEO of Lehman Brothers
 Lewis Glucksman (1925–2006), CEO and chairman of Lehman Brothers, Kuhn, Loeb
 Stanley Gold (born 1942), former president and CEO of Shamrock Holdings (Roy E. Disney's family investment firm)
 Stanley Golder (1929–2000), co-founder of private equity firm GTCR
 Marcus Goldman (1821–1904), German-born co-founder of Goldman Sachs; member of the Goldman-Sachs family
 David Gottesman (1926–2022), founder of First Manhattan Co.; member of the Gottesman family
 Noam Gottesman (born 1961), Israeli-born British-American hedge fund manager and investor, co-founder of GLG Partners, CEO of TOMS Capital
 Jonathan D. Gray (born 1970), president and COO of the Blackstone Group, chairman of Hilton Worldwide Holdings
 Leonard I. Green (1934–2002), founder of Leonard Green & Partners, West Coast's largest LBO firm
 Pincus Green (born 1934), oil and gas commodities trader
 Alan Greenspan (born 1926), former Chair of the Federal Reserve, (co-)founder of Townsend-Greenspan & Co. and Greenspan Associates
 John Gutfreund (1929–2016), former CEO of Salomon Brothers
 Rich Handler (born 1961), banker, chairman and CEO of  independent investment bank Jefferies Group
 Joshua Harris (born 1965), investor, co-founder of Apollo Global Management, owner of the New Jersey Devils and the Philadelphia 76ers
 Adrian (born 1966) and Nick Hanauer (born 1959), venture capitalists
 Alfred S. Hart (1904–1979), Hungarian-born founder of City National Bank
 Andrew Hauptman (born 1969), founder of investment firm Andell Holdings and owner of the Chicago Fire Soccer Club; son-in-law of Charles Bronfman
 Isaias W. Hellman (1842–1920), German-born banker, co-founder of the Farmers and Merchants Bank of Los Angeles (F&M), president of Wells Fargo Nevada National Bank
 Samuel J. Heyman (1939–2009), hedge fund manager and chairman of the GAF Materials Corporation 
 Ben Horowitz (born 1966), start-up investor, co-founder of Andreessen Horowitz
 Carl Icahn (born 1936), Corporate raider, founder of Icahn Enterprises
 Mat Ishbia (born 1979/1980), CEO and chairman of mortgage lender United Wholesale Mortgage
 Samuel Israel III (born 1959), former hedge fund manager, founder of the Bayou Hedge Fund Group
 Kenneth M. Jacobs (born 1957/1958), chairman and CEO of Lazard Ltd
 Mitchell R. Julis (born 1955), co-founder of the Canyon Capital Advisors hedge fund
 David Kabiller (born 1964), co-founder of investment management firm AQR Capital
 Neil Kadisha (born 1955), Iranian-born co-founder of investment firm Omninet Capital
 Irving Kahn (1905–2015), investor, co-founder of Kahn Brothers Group
 Otto Hermann Kahn (1867–1934), German-born investment banker, partner at Kuhn, Loeb & Co.; known for the reorganization of American railroad systems
 George Kaiser (born 1942), chairman of BOK Financial Corporation
 Robert S. Kapito (born 1957), investor, co-founder of BlackRock, chair of the board of UJA-Federation of New York
 Steven Kaplan, co-founder of Oaktree Capital Management, co-owner of MLS' D.C. United and EFL Championship's Swansea City A.F.C.
 George Karfunkel (born 1948/1949), Hungarian-born co-founder of AmTrust Financial Services and American Stock Transfer & Trust Company (AST)
 Bruce Karsh (born 1955), investor, co-founder of Oaktree Capital Management, chairman of the Tribune Media Company
 Richard A. Kayne (born 1945/1946), co-founder of Kayne Anderson Capital Advisers
 Tal Keinan (born 1969), American-Israeli investor, co-founder of Clarity Capital
 Barry Klarberg (born 1961), founder of Monarch Business & Wealth Management; co-owner of MLB's New York Yankees and MLS's New York City FC
 Seth Klarman (born 1957), investor and hedge fund manager, founder of the Baupost Group; minority owner of MLB's Boston Red Sox
 Eugene Kleiner (1923–2003), Austrian-born venture capitalist who co-founded KPCB and is considered a pioneer of Silicon Valley 
 Jerome Kohlberg Jr. (1925–2015), co-founder of KKR, founder of Kohlberg & Company
 Sonja Kohn (born 1948), Austrian-American banker
 Bruce Kovner (born 1945), investor, hedge fund manager, chairman of CAM Capital
 Orin Kramer (born 1945), hedge fund manager, founder of Boston Provident
 Peter S. Kraus, CEO of AllianceBernstein (AB)
 Henry R. Kravis (born 1944), co-founder of KKR
 Rodger Krouse (born 1961), co-founder of Sun Capital Partners
 Joe Lacob (born 1956), Silicon Valley investor, partner at Kleiner Perkins Caufield & Byers (KPCB), co-owner of NBA's Golden State Warriors
 Andrew A. Lanyi (1925–2009), Hungarian-born investor, founder of the Lanyi Group
 Marc Lasry (born 1959), Moroccan-born hedge fund manager, co-founder (along with his sister Sonia (born 1962)) of the Avenue Capital Group, co-owner of NBA's Milwaukee Bucks
 Henry Laufer (born 1945), investor, former VP of Research at Renaissance Technologies, co-founder of the Medallion Fund
 Jonathan Lavine (born 1966), co-managing partner of investment firm Bain Capital and CIO of Bain Capital Credit; co-owner of NBA's Boston Celtics
 Solomon Lazard (1827–1916), French-born founder of Lazard Frères and Company; member of the Lazard family
 Sayra (1898–1994), Jim (1928–2014) and Alexandra Lebenthal (born 1964), Lebenthal & Company
 Bennett S. LeBow (born 1937), chairman of the Board of the Vector Group, former owner of the Liggett Group
 Marc J. Leder (born 1962), co-founder of Sun Capital Partners, co-owner of the Philadelphia 76ers
 Thomas H. Lee (born 1944), founder of the private equity firms THL and Lee Equity Partners
 Henry (1822–1855), Mayer (1830–1897) and Emanuel Lehman (1827–1907), German-born founders of Lehman Brothers; members of the Lehman family
 Al Lerner (1933–2002), former chairman of the Board of credit card company MBNA and owner of NFL's Cleveland Browns
 Randy Lerner (born 1962), investor, former owner of the MBNA Corporation; former owner of EPL's Aston Villa F.C.
 Dennis Levine (born 1952), former managing director at Drexel Burnham Lambert
 Leon Levy (1925–2003), investor, former partner at Oppenheimer & Co.
 Peter B. Lewis (1933–2013), former chairman and owner of the Progressive Insurance Company
 Cy Lewis (1908–1978), long-time managing partner of Bear, Stearns & Company
 Josh Linkner (born 1970), former CEO of Detroit Venture Partners
 Greg Lippmann (born 1968/1969), hedge fund manager, co-founder of LibreMax Partners
 Daniel S. Loeb (born 1961), hedge fund manager, founder of Third Point Management
 Solomon Loeb (1828–1903), German-born co-founder of Kuhn, Loeb & Co. 
 Howard Lorber (born 1948), CEO of New Valley LLC (formerly Western Union), chairman of Douglas Elliman and Nathan's Famous
 Howard Lutnick (born 1961), chairman and CEO of Cantor Fitzgerald & BGC Partners
 Bernie Madoff (1938–2021), financier and chairman of the  Nasdaq, founder of Bernard L. Madoff Investment Securities; Ponzi schemer
 Stephen Mandel, Jr. (born 1956), hedge fund manager, investor, founder of Lone Pine Capital, former managing director at the Tiger Fund
 Leo Melamed (born 1932), Polish-born financial futures pioneer, chairman emeritus of the CME Group
 James Melcher (born 1939), hedge fund manager, founder of Balestra Capital Management; former Olympic fencer
 J. Ezra Merkin (born 1953), investor, hedge fund manager, former president of the Fifth Avenue Synagogue; Madoff Ponzi scheme victim
 André Meyer (1898–1979), French-American investment banker, former senior partner at Lazard Frères & Co.
 Marc Eugene Meyer (1842–1925), French-American former president of Lazard Frères & Co.
 Marc Mezvinsky (born 1977), investment banker, co-founder of Eaglevale Partners; husband of Chelsea Clinton
 Michael Milken (born 1946), financier, junk-bond specialist, founder of the Milken Institute
 Eric Mindich, hedge fund manager, founder of Eton Park Capital Management
 Steven Mnuchin (born 1962), former hedge fund manager; 77th United States Secretary of the Treasury
 David Morgenthaler (1919–2016), founder of Morgenthaler, one of the oldest private equity investment firms in the U.S.
 Sir Michael Moritz (born 1954), British-American Silicon Valley venture capitalist, partner at Sequoia Capital
 Alfred Huger Moses (1840–1918), banker and investor who founded the city of Sheffield, Alabama
 Andrew M. Murstein (born 1964), founder of investment company Medallion Financial Corp., former taxi medallion lending executive, owner of MLL's New York Lizards
 Arthur Nadel (1933–2012), former hedge fund manager, founder of Scoop Management Co.
 Ezri Namvar (born 1951/1952), Iranian-born founder of the Namco Capital Group and former owner of the Security Pacific Bank
 Jack Nash (1929–2008), German-born hedge fund pioneer, former chairman of Oppenheimer & Company, co-founder of the New York Sun
 Elkan Naumburg (1835–1924), German-born banker, founder of E. Naumburg & Co.
 Izak Parviz Nazarian (1929–2017), Iranian-American investor, managing partner at Omninet Capital; member of the Nazarian family
 Roy Neuberger (1903–2010), financier, co-founder of Neuberger Berman
 Aviv Nevo (born 1965), Romanian-born Israeli-American venture capitalist, founder of NV Investments; major shareholder in Time Warner
 Roy (born 1966) and Victor Niederhoffer (born 1943), hedge fund managers
 Mark Nordlicht (born 1968), American-Israeli hedge fund manager, founder of Platinum Partners
 Nelson Obus (born 1947), hedge fund manager, co-founder of Wynnefield Capital
 Daniel Och (born 1961), investor and hedge fund manager, founder of the Och-Ziff Capital Management Group (now Sculptor Capital Management)
 Bernard Osher (born 1927), a founding director of World Savings Bank
 Jacob Ostreicher (born 1959), investor
 Alan Patricof (born 1934), venture capital and private equity pioneer; co-founder of Apax Partners and Greycroft
 David L. Paul (1939–2022), banker, founder of Miami-based CenTrust Bank
 John Paulson (born 1955), investor, founder of Paulson & Co.
 Stephen M. Peck (1935–2004), co-founder of asset management firm Weiss, Peck & Greer
 Nelson Peltz (born 1942), investor, co-founder of Trian Fund Management 
 Jeffrey, Raymond (1917–2019) and Ron Perelman (born 1943), investors
 Richard C. Perry (born 1955), hedge fund manager, founder of Perry Capital
 Carl Pforzheimer (1879–1957), banker, co-founder of the American Stock Exchange, founder of Carl H. Pforzheimer & Co.
 Lionel Pincus (1931–2009), co-founder of private equity firm Warburg Pincus
 Danny Porush (born 1957), former stock broker and chairman of Stratton Oakmont
 Victor Posner (1918–2002), LBO pioneer
 Michael F. Price (born 1951), hedge fund manager, founder of MFP Investors
 Nicholas (born 1945), Karen (born 1958), Jennifer (born 1950) and John Pritzker (19&3–), investors; members of the Pritzker family
 Dan Rapoport (1970–2022), Latvian-born investor, founder of Rapoport Capital
 Ira Rennert (born 1934), industrial investor, founder of the Renco Group
 Tony Ressler (born 1960), private equity tycoon and venture capitalist, co-founder of Ares Management and Apollo Global Management; owner of NBA's Atlanta Hawks
 Marc Rich (1934–2013), Belgian-American former oil trader, hedge fund manager and founder of Glencore plc
 Larry Robbins (born 1969), hedge fund manager, founder of Glenview Capital Management
 Stephen Robert (born 1940), former chairman and CEO of Oppenheimer & Co. and Renaissance Institutional Management (subsidiary of Renaissance Technologies)
 George R. Roberts (born 1944), co-founder of KKR
 Arthur Rock (born 1926), early Silicon Valley venture capitalist, co-founder of Davis & Rock and Fairchild Semiconductor
 George Rohr (born 1954), Colombian-born co-founder of private equity firm NCH Capital
 David S. Rose (born 1957), start-up investor, founder of New York Angels
 Barry Rosenstein (born 1960), hedge fund manager, founder of JANA Partners
 Mack Rossoff, founder of independent investment bank Rossoff & Co.
 David René de Rothschild (born 1942), banker; current chairman of Rothschild & Co; member of the Rothschild family
 Marc Rowan (born 1962), co-founder of Apollo Global Management
 David M. Rubenstein (born 1949), financier, co-founder of global private equity investment company The Carlyle Group
 Robert Rubin (born 1938), former Treasury Secretary, director of National Economic Council, and chairman of Citigroup
 Samuel Sachs (1851–1935), co-founder of Goldman Sachs
 William Salomon (1914–2014), former managing partner of Salomon Brothers
 Arthur J. Samberg (1941–2020), founder of Pequot Capital Management
 Morris Schapiro (1903–1996), Lithuanian-born investment banker, founder of M. A. Schapiro & Company; known for negotiating the merger of Chase Bank and Bank of Manhattan
 Jacob H. Schiff (1847–1920), German-born banker; former leader of Kuhn, Loeb & Co.
 Peter Schiff (born 1963), CEO and chief global strategist of Euro Pacific Capital.
 Rick Schnall (born 1970), partner at private equity firm Clayton Dubilier & Rice and minority owner of NBA's Atlanta Hawks
 Alan Schwartz (born 1950/1951), Executive Chairman of Guggenheim Partners, former (and last) CEO of Bear, Stearns & Company
 Stephen A. Schwarzman (born 1947), co-founder of the Blackstone Group
 Joseph Seligman (1819–1880), German-born co-founder of investment bank J. & W. Seligman & Co.
 David E. Shaw (1951–), founder of D. E. Shaw & Co.
 Bruce Sherman (born 1948), co-founder of wealth-management firm Private Capital Management (PCM) and owner of MLB's Miami Marlins
 Eugene Shvidler (born 1964), Russian-American oil tycoon, chairman of Millhouse Capital
 Jim Simons (born 1938), hedge fund manager, co-founder of Renaissance Technologies
 Nat Simons (born 1966), hedge fund manager and investor, (co-)founder of the Meritage Group and Prelude Ventures, co-chairman of  Renaissance Technologies
 Paul Singer (born 1944), hedge fund manager, founder of the Elliott Management Corporation
 David M. Solomon (born 1962), disc jockey and investment banker, CEO of Goldman Sachs
 George Soros (born 1930), Hungarian-American investor and business magnate, founder of Soros Fund Management; member of the Soros family
 James Speyer (1861–1941), former head of the banking firm Speyer & Co.; member of the Speyer family
 Robert B. Stearns (1888–1954), financier, co-founder of Bear, Stearns & Co. Inc
 Amanda Steinberg (born 1977/1978), founder of DailyWorth
 Saul Steinberg (1939–2012), Corporate raider
 Michael Steinhardt (born 1940), investor and hedge fund manager, co-founder of Steinhardt Partners, chairman of WisdomTree Investments
 Lee Stern (born 1926), futures and options trader; founder of Lee B. Stern & Company; co-owner of MLB's Chicago White Sox
 Leonard N. Stern (born 1938), investor, chairman and CEO of the Hartz Group and Hartz Mountain Industries
 Marc Stern, chairman of the TCW Group, co-owner of NBA's Milwaukee Bucks and MLB's Milwaukee Brewers
 Stuart Sternberg (born 1959), Wall Street investor, owner of MLB's Tampa Bay Rays
 Barry Sternlicht (born 1960), co-founder of investment firm Starwood Capital Group, former chairman of Starwood
 Donald Sussman (born 1946), financier, hedge fund manager, founder of Paloma Funds and New China Capital Management
 Leonard M. Tannenbaum (born 1971), founder of Fifth Street Asset Management
 David Tepper (born 1957), investor, hedge fund manager, founder of Appaloosa Management
 David Tisch (born 1981), start-up investor, co-founder of BoxGroup; member of the Tisch family
 Igor Tulchinsky (born 1966), Belarus-born hedge fund manager, founder of WorldQuant
 Cliff Viner (born 1948), hedge fund manager, co-founder of III Capital Management and AVM, former co-owner of the Florida Panthers
 Jeffrey Vinik (born 1959), former hedge fund manager, owner of NHL's Tampa Bay Lightning
 Paul Wachter (born 1956), founder of Main Street Advisors, a VIP-focused financial and asset management advisory firm
 Eric M. Warburg (1900–1990), German-American co-founder of Warburg Pincus; member of the Warburg family
 James Warburg (1896–1969), German-born banker and financial adviser to Franklin D. Roosevelt
 Paul Warburg (1868–1932), German-born former chairman of the Bank of the Manhattan Company (predecessor of Chase Manhattan Bank) and director of the Federal Reserve Bank
 Bruce Wasserstein (1947–2009), investment banker, former CEO of Lazard and co-founder of Wasserstein Perella & Co.
 Sanford I. Weill (born 1933), banker & financier, former chairman and CEO of Citigroup, co-founder of Carter, Berlind, Potoma & Weill
 Peter Weinberg (born 1957), co-founder of Perella Weinberg Partners
 Boaz Weinstein (born 1973), hedge fund manager, founder of Saba Capital Management
 Sholam Weiss (born 1954), bankruptcy specialist 
 Allen Weisselberg (born 1947), CFO of the Trump Organization
 Maurice Wertheim (1886–1950), founder of Wertheim & Co.
 Oren Zeev (born 1964), Israeli-American start-up investor, founder of Zeev Ventures, co-founder of Tipalti
 Nancy Zimmerman (born 1963/1964), hedge fund manager, co-founder of Bracebridge Capital
 Eric Zinterhofer (born 1971), private equity financier, founding partner of Searchlight Capital; member of the Lauder family
 Barry Zubrow (born 1953), founder of private investment firm ITB, former CRO of JPMorgan Chase

See also
 Lists of Jewish Americans
 Businesspeople
 in media
 in real estate
 in retail

References

Jewish